Hazard (Rebecca "Becky" Sharpe) is a fictional character appearing in comic books published by DC Comics. She is the granddaughter of Gambler.

Hazard made her live-action debut on the fourth season of The Flash, portrayed by Sugar Lyn Beard.

Fictional character biography
During the anti-hero mania that was sweeping the U.S. (during the Legends miniseries, 1986), Miss Rebecca Sharpe took the opportunity to avenge the death of her grandfather, Steven Sharpe III alias the Gambler. Rebecca took the name Hazard and joined with the Wizard in his new Injustice Society – which he called Injustice Unlimited. However, she refused to allow anyone to be killed, nor would she cause anyone's death in the process. They overcame the security at the International Trade Conference in Calgary—namely Infinity, Inc. and a contingent of the Global Guardians—and forced the heroes to help in some mayhem. Hazard took Wildcat and the Tasmanian Devil to Las Vegas and, with their help, financially ruined Mr. Taj, proprietor of the Taj Mahal Casino - it had been the crooked games of the casino which were in part to blame for her grandfather's suicide. They all returned to Calgary to share in the stolen wealth which the Wizard had been gathering, but the plan went haywire when Hourman revived and freed himself, as well as when Solomon Grundy was brought in from the Arctic Circle. It was Solomon who incapacitated Hazard, but in the confusion she was able to escape.

Only weeks later, Hazard joined again with the villains the Icicle II and Artemis, along with the Harlequin (Marcie Cooper). The Harlequin brought in the Dummy and a duped Solomon Grundy. Under the leadership of the Dummy, their first goal was to murder the members of Infinity, Inc. so that the world and the criminal underworld would know and fear Injustice Unlimited.  Though Hazard had previously voiced an unwillingness to take life, she consented to the murder of the super-powered Infinitors. The first target was Skyman, and he was successfully murdered by Harlequin. Within days Hazard joined with Harlequin and the Dummy to murder Pat Dugan working at Stellar Studios (the Infinity, Inc. HQ) outside Los Angeles. When Pat's young son became a collateral target, however, Hazard used her powers of probability manipulation to help save their lives – the Dummy decided instead to use Dugan as bait for the rest of the Infinitors. When the other heroes arrived at their HQ and the battle was begun, Hazard feigned the loss of her dice and did not join in. Afterwards, when the villains were successfully defeated, Hazard voluntarily entered into custody for her role in the criminal events.

Hazard last appeared with several other villainesses who were hunting male superheroes who had been turned into animals by Circe. This takes place in a magically entrapped New York City.

Powers and abilities
Hazard has psionic powers that she uses in conjunction with special dice to influence probability as she wishes. She can cause good luck or harmful "accidents" to befall someone. The origin of her powers, nature of her dice, and the relationship between them are unknown. In addition, she keeps herself in good physical condition but has no known training in hand-to-hand combat.

Family
 Steven Sharpe III is Rebecca's grandfather and was the original Gambler who vexed the original Justice Society in the late 1940s.
 Steven Sharpe V is Rebecca's cousin. He has taken over their grandfather's criminal mantle as the current Gambler.

Other characters named Hazard
 Manuel Cabral: The head of Rainforest Technology who takes up the name Hazard when he leads the Black Ops. He and the Black Ops have clashed with Steel many times.
 Perseus "Percy" Hazard: The grandson of Ulysses Hazard / Gravedigger and leader of Squad K.

Other versions

Earth-2
Roger Sharpe of Earth-2 who was introduced in the "The New 52" and operates in Casablanca under the alias of "Darcy Twain".

In other media
Rebecca "Becky" Sharpe / Hazard appears in The Flash, portrayed by Sugar Lyn Beard. Introduced in the fourth season episode, "Luck Be a Lady", this version was plagued by bad luck until the Thinker tricks the Flash into exposing her to dark matter during a previous episode. After acquiring the power to emit a field that alters local probability, giving her good luck while causing bad luck for everyone around her, she unknowingly expands the field while reaping the benefits of her powers. The Flash attempts to talk her down, but she refuses, seeing her powers as retribution for her previous suffering. Due to the field threatening to engulf Central City and reactivating S.T.A.R. Labs' particle accelerator, Harry Wells allows it to go off and temporarily negate her powers, allowing the Flash to arrest her and remand her to Iron Heights Penitentiary. After the Thinker arranges for the Flash's incarceration in Iron Heights, the latter joins Sharpe, Kilg%re, Dwarfstar, and Black Bison in mounting an escape in the episode "True Colors" before Warden Gregory Wolfe can sell them to Amunet Black. Amidst this, Sharpe confesses to the Flash that she did not wish harm on anyone and that she was afraid of her powers. While he inspires her to use her powers for good, the Thinker immobilizes the Flash so he can kill the inmates for their powers and transfer his mind into Sharpe's body. In the following episode "Subject 9", the Thinker continues to use Sharpe's body to fulfill his plans before transferring his consciousness to the Fiddler's body due to the build-up of dark matter. Following changes made to the multiverse during the events of the crossover "Crisis on Infinite Earths", Sharpe was resurrected off-screen as of the ninth season episode "The Good, the Bad, and the Lucky".

References

External links
 Cosmic Teams history page

Characters created by Roy Thomas
Comics characters introduced in 1987
DC Comics female supervillains
DC Comics metahumans
Fictional characters who can manipulate probability